William Mackenzie, McKenzie, Mckenzie or MacKenzie may refer to:

Artists, musicians, writers and entertainers
 William Lyon Mackenzie (1795–1861), Scottish-born journalist & rebel in Upper Canada; grandfather of Canadian prime minister William Lyon MacKenzie King
 William Lyon Mackenzie (fireboat)
 William Mackay Mackenzie (1871–1952), Scottish historian, archaeologist and writer
 Will Mackenzie (born 1938), American television director and actor
 Billy Mackenzie (William MacArthur MacKenzie, 1957–1997), Scottish singer

Politicians and noblemen
 Bill McKenzie, Baron McKenzie of Luton (1946-2021), English politician
 William Mackenzie, 1st Baron Amulree (1860–1942), British barrister, public servant and politician
 William Mackenzie, 5th Earl of Seaforth (died 1740), Scottish nobleman
 William Albany McKenzie (1928–1991), mayor of Fremantle, Western Australia, and Administrator of Christmas Island
 William Alexander McKenzie (1874–1966), builder and political figure in British Columbia
 William Forbes Mackenzie (1807–1862), Scottish Conservative politician and temperance reformer
 William H. MacKenzie (1890–1972), New York assemblyman
 William McKenzie (Australian politician) (1883–1969), Victorian state politician

Sportsmen
 Bill MacKenzie (William Kenneth MacKenzie, 1911–1990), Canadian ice hockey player
 Bill McKenzie (ice hockey) (William Ian McKenzie, born 1949), Canadian ice hockey player
 Bill McKenzie (footballer) (1889–1983), Australian footballer for Melbourne
 Bill S. McKenzie (1934–1974), Australian footballer for Richmond
 Bill McKenzie (rugby league), New Zealand rugby league player
 Will MacKenzie (William Ruggles MacKenzie, born 1974), American golfer
 Billy MacKenzie (motorcyclist) (born 1984), Scottish motocross racer
 William McKenzie (rugby union) (1871–1943), international New Zealand rugby union player

Other people
 William Mackenzie (contractor) (1794–1851), British civil engineering contractor
 William Mackenzie (ophthalmologist) (1791–1868), Scottish ophthalmologist
 William Mackenzie (trader) (1826-1890), born in Edinburgh, trader in Arorae, Gilbert Islands.
 William Mackenzie (railway entrepreneur) (1849–1923), railway contractor and entrepreneur in Canada, the United States, and Brazil
 William Mackenzie (doctor) (1862–1935), doctor in public health
 William Colin Mackenzie (1877–1938), Australian anatomist, benefactor, museum administrator and director
 William Douglas Mackenzie (1859–1936), American theologian
 William Gregor MacKenzie (1904-1995), plantsman and gardener
 William Macdonald Mackenzie (1797–1856), Scottish architect
 William MacKenzie (missionary) (1897–1972), Australian missionary
 William McKenzie (missionary) (1861–1895), Canadian missionary
 William Mackenzie (publisher), publisher of natural history books in the 1870s
 W. J. M. Mackenzie (William James Millar Mackenzie, 1909–1996), British political scholar
 William John MacKenzie (1894–?), American flying ace

Characters
 Will McKenzie (Inbetweeners), fictional character